Puck Moonen (born 20 March 1996 in Sint-Michielsgestel) is a Dutch cyclist, who has ridden in the past for UCI Women's Continental Team . She previously rode for Lotto Soudal but left, in part due to a knee injury.

References

External links

1996 births
Living people
Dutch female cyclists
People from Sint-Michielsgestel
Cyclists from North Brabant
21st-century Dutch women